The 1950 World University Cycling Championship was a World University Cycling Championship not organized by the International University Sports Federation (FISU). The championship consisted of a road cycling road race event. Jean Bobet from France defended successfully his title and became again World University Cycling Champion.

Events summary

Road Cycling

References

World University Cycling Championships
World Championships
1950 in cycle racing